Fox 6 may refer to one of the following television stations in the United States that are currently affiliated or were former affiliates of the American broadcast network Fox:

Currently affiliated
KEQI-LD, Dededo, Guam (virtual channel 22, brands with cable channel)
KFDM-DT3, a subchannel of KFDM in Beaumont, Texas; brands with cable channel
KIDY, San Angelo, Texas; brands with cable channel 10
WABG-DT2, a subchannel of WABG-TV in Greenville/Greenwood, Mississippi; brands with cable channel
WBRC, Birmingham, Alabama
WGGB-DT2, a subchannel of WGGB-TV in Springfield, Massachusetts; brands with cable channel
WITI (TV), Milwaukee, Wisconsin (owned and operated)
WLUC-DT2, a subchannel of WLUC-TV in Marquette, Michigan; brands as "Fox U.P."

Formerly affiliated
 WCIX (now WFOR-TV), Miami, Florida (1986–1989)
XETV-TDT, San Diego, California (licensed to Tijuana, Baja California, Mexico; 1986–2008)